Donald Milford Payne Jr. (born December 17, 1958) is an American politician who has been the U.S. representative for  since 2012. A member of the Democratic Party, Payne served as president of the Newark city council from 2010 to 2012.

Following the death of his father, U.S. Representative Donald M. Payne, on March 6, 2012, Payne ran in the primary to succeed him in Congress. His father was first elected in 1988 and reelected 11 times without significant opposition. Payne Jr. won the June 5 Democratic primary election, which is tantamount to election in the heavily Democratic district, and the November 6 general election.

Early life, education, and early career
Payne was born and raised with his two sisters, Wanda and Nicole, in Newark, New Jersey. His father Donald M. Payne, served in the United States House of Representatives from 1989 until his death in 2012. He was the first African-American to represent the state of New Jersey in Congress. His mother Hazel Payne (née Johnson), died in 1963 when Payne was five years old. As a teenager, he founded and was the first president of the Newark South Ward Junior Democrats. He studied graphic arts at Kean University. He was an adviser at the YMCA Youth in Government program.

Payne worked for the New Jersey Highway Authority from 1991 until he joined the Essex County Educational Services Commission in 1996, where he worked as the Supervisor of Student Transportation.

Newark Municipal Council
In 2010, Payne was reelected to the Municipal Council of Newark with 19% of the vote, serving from July 1, 2006 to November 6, 2012. Other candidates elected were Mildred C. Crump, Luis Quintana, and Carlos Gonzales.

As a city councilman, Payne supported Planned Parenthood, stem cell research, Medicaid and education funding.

In July 2010, Payne was elected president of the Newark City Council, succeeding Crump.

Payne's committee assignments included Health, Education and Recreation.

Essex County Board of Freeholders
In 2005, Payne was one of four candidates elected to the at-large seat, serving from January 1, 2006 to November 6, 2012. He finished first with 19% of the vote. In 2008, he was reelected to a second term with 20% of the vote. In 2011, he was reelected to a third term with 18% of the vote.

Committee assignments
 Budget Review
 Finance Oversight
 Health Care/Benefits (Chairman)
 Hospital Center Oversight
 Labor Union Oversight
 Public Safety Panel
 Recreation
 Review the Essex County Code
 Review Purchasing Procedures
 Transportation Oversight (Chairman)
 Turtle Back Zoo

U.S. House of Representatives

Elections

2012 special election

After his father's death, Payne declared his intention to run in two elections in 2012: the special election to fill the remainder of his father's unexpired term, and the regularly scheduled election for the two-year term beginning in January 2013. The primaries for both elections were held on June 5, and the general elections on November 6.

According to documents filed on May 24 with the Federal Election Commission, Payne both raised and spent more money than any other Democratic candidate. House Minority Leader Nancy Pelosi endorsed Payne on May 22.

In the Democratic primary for the special election, Payne faced Ronald C. Rice (son of State Senator Ronald Rice) and Irvington Mayor Wayne Smith. He won the primary with 71% of the vote to Rice's 25% and Smith 5%.

In the Democratic primary for the full term, Payne faced Rice, Smith, State Senator Nia Gill, Cathy Wright of Newark, and Dennis R. Flynn of Glen Ridge. He won with 60% of the vote, to Rice's 19%, Gill's 17%. Smith, Wright and Flynn combined for about 5% of the vote.

After the election, Payne said, "I've said that I'm following a legacy and I'm not backing away from that."

2012
In the November 6 general election, Payne defeated Republican nominee Brian C. Kelemen with 87% of the vote. He ran unopposed for the special election to fill the remainder of his father's term. The 10th is a heavily Democratic, black-majority district, and Payne had effectively assured himself election with his primary victory.

2014

2016

2018

2020

2022

Tenure
Payne was sworn into office on November 15, 2012. He co-sponsored the Violence Against Women Reauthorization Act of 2013 and the Paycheck Fairness Act, a bill aimed at expanding the scope of the Equal Pay Act of 1963 and Fair Labor Standards Act. Payne also co-sponsored H.R. 41, authorizing $30.4 billion from the Federal Emergency Management Agency's National Flood Insurance Program to victims of Hurricane Sandy.

On March 24, 2014, Payne introduced the Department of Homeland Security Interoperable Communications Act (H.R. 4289; 113th Congress) a bill that would require the United States Department of Homeland Security (DHS), within 120 days of the bill's enactment, to devise a strategy to improve communications among DHS agencies. DHS would be required to submit regular reports to Congress on its progress and the decisions it makes.

Committee assignments
 Committee on Homeland Security
 Subcommittee on Emergency Preparedness, Response, and Communications (Chair)
 Subcommittee on Oversight, Investigations, and Management
 Committee on Transportation and Infrastructure
 Subcommittee on Aviation
 Subcommittee on Railroads, Pipelines and Hazardous Materials

Caucus memberships
 Congressional Black Caucus
 Congressional Caucus on Sudan and South Sudan
 Congressional Small Business Caucus
 Ports, Opportunity, Renewable, Trade, and Security (PORTS) Caucus
 Congressional Arts Caucus
United States Congressional International Conservation Caucus
Blue Collar Caucus

Electoral history

Personal life
Payne lives in Newark with his wife, Bea, and their triplets.

See also 
 List of African-American United States representatives
 Final Report of the Task Force on Combating Terrorist and Foreign Fighter Travel

References

External links

 Congressman Donald M. Payne Jr. official U.S. House website
 Campaign website
 
 

|-

1958 births
21st-century American politicians
African-American members of the United States House of Representatives
African-American city council members in New Jersey
County commissioners in New Jersey
Kean University alumni
Democratic Party members of the United States House of Representatives from New Jersey
Living people
Members of the Municipal Council of Newark
21st-century African-American politicians
20th-century African-American people